The 1984 CFL season is considered to be the 31st season in modern-day Canadian football, although it is officially the 27th Canadian Football League season.

CFL News in 1984
The CFL granted a conditional expansion team to the city of Halifax, the team was named the Atlantic Schooners. The franchise were supposed to begin play in 1984. However, before the season started, ownership could not secure and provide the financing for a new stadium. Without a stadium in place, the Schooners folded without playing a single game in the CFL.

Calgary native Douglas H. Mitchell, Q.C. became the sixth CFL Commissioner in history on Friday, June 1, succeeding Jake Gaudaur who had served in that position since 1968.

In the fall, the CFL conducted a market research study with the fans in CFL cities.

The CFL, eliminated territorial exemptions, which allowed the 1985 Canadian College Draft to be more open – allowing teams to draft players from different regions.

The regular season started in June for the first time in league history, while Edmonton hosted its first Grey Cup championship game.

Regular season standings

Final regular season standings
Note: GP = Games Played, W = Wins, L = Losses, T = Ties, PF = Points For, PA = Points Against, Pts = Points

Bold text means that they have clinched the playoffs.
BC and Toronto have first round byes.

Grey Cup playoffs

The Winnipeg Blue Bombers are the 1984 Grey Cup champions, defeating the Hamilton Tiger-Cats 47–17, at Edmonton's Commonwealth Stadium. This was Winnipeg's first Grey Cup victory since 1962. The Blue Bombers' Tom Clements (QB) was named the Grey Cup's Most Valuable Player on Offence and Tyrone Jones (LB) was named Grey Cup's Most Valuable Player on Defence, while Sean Kehoe (RB) was named the Grey Cup's Most Valuable Canadian.

Playoff bracket

*-Team won in Overtime.

CFL Leaders
 CFL Passing Leaders
 CFL Rushing Leaders
 CFL Receiving Leaders

1984 CFL All-Stars

Offence
QB – Tom Clements, Winnipeg Blue Bombers
RB – Willard Reaves, Winnipeg Blue Bombers
RB – Dwaine Wilson, Montreal Concordes
TE – Nick Arakgi, Montreal Concordes
SB – Joe Poplawski, Winnipeg Blue Bombers
WR – Brian Kelly, Edmonton Eskimos
WR – Mervyn Fernandez, BC Lions
C – John Bonk, Winnipeg Blue Bombers
OG – Nick Bastaja, Winnipeg Blue Bombers
OG – Dan Ferrone, Toronto Argonauts
OT – Chris Walby, Winnipeg Blue Bombers
OT – John Blain, BC Lions

Defence
DT – James Curry, Toronto Argonauts
DT – Mack Moore, BC Lions
DE – Steve Raquet, Montreal Concordes
DE – James "Quick" Parker, BC Lions
LB – Aaron Brown, Winnipeg Blue Bombers
LB – Tyrone Jones, Winnipeg Blue Bombers
LB – Stewart Hill, Edmonton Eskimos
DB – David Shaw, Winnipeg Blue Bombers
DB – Harry Skipper, Montreal Concordes
DB – Ken Hailey, Winnipeg Blue Bombers
DB – Larry Crawford, BC Lions
DB – Laurent DesLauriers, Edmonton Eskimos

Special teams
P – Bernie Ruoff, Hamilton Tiger-Cats
K – Lui Passaglia, BC Lions

1984 Eastern All-Stars

Offence
QB – Joe Barnes, Toronto Argonauts
RB – Lester Brown, Toronto Argonauts
RB – Dwaine Wilson, Montreal Concordes
TE – Nick Arakgi, Montreal Concordes
SB – Paul Pearson, Toronto Argonauts
WR – Terry Greer, Toronto Argonauts
WR – Ron Johnson, Hamilton Tiger-Cats
C – Henry Waszczuk, Hamilton Tiger-Cats
OG – Lloyd Fairbanks, Montreal Concordes
OG – Dan Ferrone, Toronto Argonauts
OT – Miles Gorrell, Montreal Concordes
OT – John Malinosky, Toronto Argonauts

Defence
DT – James Curry, Toronto Argonauts
DT – Doug Scott, Montreal Concordes
DE – Steve Raquet, Montreal Concordes
DE – Greg Marshall, Ottawa Rough Riders
LB – William Mitchell, Toronto Argonauts
LB – Al Washington, Ottawa Rough Riders
LB – Ben Zambiasi, Hamilton Tiger-Cats
DB – Carl Brazley, Toronto Argonauts
DB – Harry Skipper, Montreal Concordes
DB – Felix Wright, Hamilton Tiger-Cats
DB – Ricky Barden, Ottawa Rough Riders
DB – Phil Jones, Montreal Concordes

Special teams
P – Bernie Ruoff, Hamilton Tiger-Cats
K – Bernie Ruoff, Hamilton Tiger-Cats

1984 Western All-Stars

Offence
QB – Tom Clements, Winnipeg Blue Bombers
RB – Willard Reaves, Winnipeg Blue Bombers
RB – Craig Ellis, Saskatchewan Roughriders
SB – Chris DeFrance, Saskatchewan Roughriders
SB – Joe Poplawski, Winnipeg Blue Bombers
WR – Brian Kelly, Edmonton Eskimos
WR – Mervyn Fernandez, BC Lions
C – John Bonk, Winnipeg Blue Bombers
OG – Nick Bastaja, Winnipeg Blue Bombers
OG – Leo Blanchard, Edmonton Eskimos
OT – Chris Walby, Winnipeg Blue Bombers
OT – John Blain, BC Lions

Defence
DT – Randy Trautman, Calgary Stampeders
DT – Mack Moore, BC Lions
DE – Tony Norman, Winnipeg Blue Bombers
DE – James "Quick" Parker, BC Lions
LB – Aaron Brown, Winnipeg Blue Bombers
LB – Tyrone Jones, Winnipeg Blue Bombers
LB – Stewart Hill, Edmonton Eskimos
DB – David Shaw, Winnipeg Blue Bombers
DB – Terry Irvin, Saskatchewan Roughriders
DB – Ken Hailey, Winnipeg Blue Bombers
DB – Larry Crawford, BC Lions
DB – Laurent DesLauriers, Edmonton Eskimos

Special teams
P – Bob Cameron, Winnipeg Blue Bombers
K – Lui Passaglia, BC Lions

1984 CFL Awards
CFL's Most Outstanding Player Award – Willard Reaves (RB), Winnipeg Blue Bombers
CFL's Most Outstanding Canadian Award – Nick Arakgi (SB), Montreal Concordes
CFL's Most Outstanding Defensive Player Award – James "Quick" Parker (DE), BC Lions
CFL's Most Outstanding Offensive Lineman Award – John Bonk (C), Winnipeg Blue Bombers
CFL's Most Outstanding Rookie Award – Dwaine Wilson (RB), Montreal Concordes
CFLPA's Outstanding Community Service Award – Bruce Walker (WR), Ottawa Rough Riders
CFL's Coach of the Year – Cal Murphy, Winnipeg Blue Bombers

References 

CFL
Canadian Football League seasons